Prevo Peak is a stratovolcano located in the central part of Simushir Island, Kuril Islands, Russia.

See also
 List of volcanoes in Russia

References
 

Simushir
Stratovolcanoes of Russia
Holocene stratovolcanoes